Edward McGlashan (12 December 1817 – 31 July 1889) was a 19th-century Member of Parliament in Dunedin, Otago, New Zealand.

McGlashan was born in Edinburgh, Scotland, in 1817. His father's family were publishers to the University of Edinburgh. After receiving a good education, McGlashan worked in the book trade. Inspired by his brother's work as secretary for the Otago Association, he decided to emigrate and left in 1848. He went to Adelaide in South Australia, then Melbourne and finally Sydney, where he sold the books that he took with him for a good profit. There, he purchased provisions that he took with himself to Dunedin in 1850, which he could once again sell at a good profit. In 1853, he was joined in Dunedin by his older brother, John McGlashan.

Edward McGlashan worked at first as a registrar at the Supreme Court under Justice Sidney Stephen. He then leased a flour mill from William Henry Valpy on the Water of Leith. He also had a store and auction room in Princes Street. From 1858 until 1862, when the Otago Gold Rush began, he was in partnership with W. Carr Young, and they traded as Young and McGlashan. McGlashan visited England in 1862.

Edward McGlashan stood for election in the first Otago Provincial Council, and represented the Dunedin Country electorate from 28 September 1853 to 15 September 1855. He was unsuccessful at some later provincial elections. In 1865, he contested the superintendency, but was beaten by Thomas Dick. He would later represent the North Harbour electorate in the 6th and 7th council, from 17 March 1871 until the abolition of the provincial governments on 31 October 1876.

He represented the City of Dunedin electorate from the 1860 general election to 1862 when he resigned; and then the Roslyn electorate from the 1871 Roslyn by-election to 1875, when he retired.

McGlashan had various business interests later in life. He dealt in stock and farmland, and owned Mount Stokes station. He owned steamers and was milling in The Catlins. He started to manufacture paper, but was unsuccessful in making it from tussock grasses. He moved to Timaru for some years and was a director of a number of companies, including a major shareholder in the New Zealand Shipping Company. After a long visit to England from 1881, he returned to Dunedin to live in St Clair.

McGlashan married twice, and his second wife was Henrietta, the daughter of George Bell; they married on 10 March 1880. McGlashan's health was poor for his last few years. He died on 31 July 1889 at his residence in St Clair, and was survived by his second wife.

Notes

References

1817 births
1889 deaths
Members of the New Zealand House of Representatives
New Zealand MPs for Dunedin electorates
Members of the Otago Provincial Council
Scottish emigrants to New Zealand
19th-century New Zealand politicians